Q Project (real name Jason Greenhalgh) is a drum and bass music producer currently signed to Hospital Records. He makes up one half of Total Science, along with fellow producer Paul Smith (who produces under the name Spinback). He is well known for his release "Champion Sound", a popular jungle anthem of the 1990s.

References

Year of birth missing (living people)
Living people
English drum and bass musicians
English DJs
English record producers
Hospital Records artists
Place of birth missing (living people)